Stachyphrynium placentarium is a species of plant in the family Marantaceae.  Its basionym was Phyllodes placentaria Lour. and was subsequently long placed as various species in the genus Phrynium.  The species is widespread throughout Asia, with records from Bhutan, southern China, India, Indo-China and Indonesia; no subspecies are listed in the Catalogue of Life.

The leaves of this species, lá dong, are notably used throughout Việt Nam as a wrapping for food items: especially bánh chưng (the glutinous rice cake consumed at Tết) and bánh tẻ.  Species in the similar genus Phrynium, including P. pubinerve may also be used for this purpose.

Uses
S. placentarium leaves are used for food wrapping in Việt Nam:

References

External links

Marantaceae
Flora of Asia